The 1970 GP Ouest-France was the 34th edition of the GP Ouest-France cycle race and was held on 25 August 1970. The race started and finished in Plouay.

General classification

References

1970
1970 in road cycling
1970 in French sport